The Greatest Gift is an NBC television movie which premiered on November 4, 1974.  Directed by Boris Sagal and starring Glenn Ford, Julie Harris, and Lance Kerwin, the film served as the pilot for the 1975 television series The Family Holvak.

Synopsis
Humble Depression-era preacher Reverend Holvak (Glenn Ford) lives with his wife Elizabeth (Julie Harris) and son Ramey (Lance Kerwin) and struggles against the injustice of violence and a corrupt sheriff in an attempt to maintain the moral values of their faith in their small town.

Cast

References
Movies made for television, 1964–2004, by Alvin H. Maril

External links

1974 television films
1974 films
1974 drama films
Films based on American novels
Films set in Tennessee
Films shot in Georgia (U.S. state)
Great Depression films
NBC network original films
Television films as pilots
Films directed by Boris Sagal